The men's team sabre was one of eight fencing events on the fencing at the 1960 Summer Olympics programme. It was the eleventh appearance of the event. The competition was held on 10 September 1960. 80 fencers from 16 nations competed.

Competition format 
The competition combined pool play with knockout rounds, a change from prior tournaments which used pool play all the way through. The first round consisted of pools, with the 18 teams entered in the competition divided into 6 pools of 3 teams (2 teams withdrew, so 2 pools had only 2 teams each). The top 2 teams in each pool after a round-robin advanced. The 12 teams remaining after the pool play competed in a four-round single-elimination bracket, with a bronze medal match between the semifinal losers. The winners of the first 4 pools received byes in the round of 16.

Each team match consisted of each of the four fencers on one team facing each fencer on the other team, for a maximum of 16 total bouts. An 8–8 tie would be resolved by touches received in victories. Bouts were to 5 touches. Only as much fencing was done as was necessary to determine pool placement (in the first round) or the winning team (in the knockout rounds), so not all matches went to the full 16 bouts but instead stopped early (typically when one team had 9 bouts won).

Results

Elimination
Ties between teams were broken by individual victories (in parentheses), then by touches received.

Championship rounds

Rosters

Argentina
 Rafael González
 Juan Larrea
 Daniel Sande
 Gustavo Vassallo

Austria
 Helmuth Resch
 Paul Kerb
 Hans Hocke
 Günther Ulrich
 Josef Wanetschek

Belgium
 José Van Baelen
 Gustave Ballister
 Marcel Van Der Auwera
 François Heywaert
 Roger Petit

France
 Marcel Parent
 Claude Gamot
 Jacques Lefèvre
 Jacques Roulot
 Claude Arabo

Germany
 Dieter Löhr
 Jürgen Theuerkauff
 Wilfried Wöhler
 Peter von Krockow
 Walter Köstner

Great Britain
 Ralph Cooperman
 Michael Amberg
 Sandy Leckie
 Michael Straus
 Donald Stringer

Hungary
 Aladár Gerevich
 Rudolf Kárpáti
 Pál Kovács
 Zoltán Horváth
 Gábor Delneky
 Tamás Mendelényi

Italy
 Wladimiro Calarese
 Giampaolo Calanchini
 Pierluigi Chicca
 Mario Ravagnan
 Roberto Ferrari

Japan
 Sonosuke Fujimaki
 Mitsuyuki Funamizu
 Tsugeo Ozawa
 Kazuhiko Tabuchi

Morocco
 Abderrahman Sebti
 Abderraouf El-Fassy
 Mohamed Ben Joullon
 Jacques Ben Gualid

Poland
 Jerzy Pawłowski
 Wojciech Zabłocki
 Marek Kuszewski
 Ryszard Zub
 Andrzej Piątkowski
 Emil Ochyra

Portugal
 Joaquim Rodrigues
 António Marquilhas
 Orlando Azinhais
 José Ferreira
 José Fernandes

Romania
 Dumitru Mustață
 Cornel Pelmuș
 Ion Santo
 Ladislau Rohony
 Emeric Arus

Soviet Union
 Yevhen Cherepovsky
 Umyar Mavlikhanov
 Nugzar Asatiani
 David Tyshler
 Yakov Rylsky

Spain
 Jesús Díez
 César de Diego
 Pablo Ordejón
 Ramón Martínez

United States
 Allan Kwartler
 George Worth
 Michael D'Asaro, Sr.
 Alfonso Morales
 Tibor Nyilas
 Dick Dyer

References

Fencing at the 1960 Summer Olympics
Men's events at the 1960 Summer Olympics